The Norwegian football champions or Eliteserien champions, are the winners of the highest-level football league in Norway. Norgesserien was competed three times with eleven conferences and play-offs from 1937–38 to 1947–48. It was then replaced by the two-conference Hovedserien, which was replaced by the single-conference 1. divisjon in 1963. The top tier changed its name to the Tippeligaen in 1990, and to the current Eliteserien for 2017 and beyond. The winners of this title are not considered Norwegian football champions, as the title is reserved for the winners of the Norwegian Football Cup.

Sixteen clubs from ten cities have won the honor. With 26 titles Rosenborg is the most successful team, including 13 consecutive titles from 1992 through 2004. In the early years, Fredrikstad was highly successful, winning the first two titles and taking nine titles until 1960–61. Viking then took over dominance and rose to become the second-most winning team with their four consecutive titles from 1972 through 1975. The double—winning the league and cup the same season—has occurred fourteen times by six clubs.

At the end of the 1937–38 season, Fredrikstad were the first club to be crowned champions in the history of the championship.  Rosenborg have won 26 titles, the most of any club. Fredrikstad are second with nine. Rosenborg dominated during the 1990s and 2000s, winning 13 consecutive league titles from 1992 to 2004. Fredrikstad secured all their titles before the league changed its format to a one-group top division in 1963. Third-most title winning team Viking dominated in the 1970s when they won five of their eight titles. Rosenborg and Viking are the only teams to have won the league title three or more consecutive times. All the clubs which have ever been crowned champions are still in existence today and all take part in the top six tiers of the Norwegian football league system - the football pyramid.

Format
Attempts to create a national league were started in 1914–16 with the Test League, although this never held any official status. The first official league competition was the League of Norway, which started being contested in the 1937–38 season. It consisted of eleven double round robin conferences, each with six or seven teams, with the conference winners playing a two-legged, four-round play-off. Only two full seasons were contested before it was interrupted by World War II, but the league saw a final season be competed in 1947–48. The Main League started in the 1948–49 season, and saw two conferences each with eight teams. At the season end, the conference winners met for a two-legged final. In the 1959–60 and 1960–61, also bronze matches were played between the two conference runners-up.

The final season, in 1961–62, saw all 16 teams collected in a single league which was played over one and a half years. Starting with the 1963, ten team were collected into a single league, named the First Division. At the same time, the season changed from a winter to a summer league. From the 1972 season, teams from Northern Norway were also allowed to participate in the 1. divisjon, for the first time creating a pan-national league. The same season saw the number of teams increase from ten to twelve. The league was renamed to Tippeligaen in 1990, after the sponsor Norsk Tipping, and in 1997 a single-conference league was created below the top league for the first time. The Tippeligaen was expanded to 14 teams from the 1995 season and to 16 teams from the 2009 season.

List
The following is a list of winners (gold), runners-up (silver) and third place (bronze) teams in the highest-level football league in Norway. It also shows teams that won the double.

Total titles won

By club 
The following is a breakdown of top three league positions by team and also presents the team's home city or town.  Teams in bold compete in the Eliteserien as of the 2023 season.

By region

By city / town

References

Champions
Norwegian
Champions